Isophrictis modesta is a moth of the family Gelechiidae. It was described by Walsingham in 1888. It is found in North America, where it has been recorded from California.

The wingspan is 10–11 mm. The forewings are uniform pale umber-brown, dotted around the apex with intermixed fuscous and hoary scales. A line of white runs also through the middle of the apical cilia. The hindwings are pale greyish.

References

Moths described in 1888
Isophrictis